ISO/IEC 10967, Language independent arithmetic (LIA), is a series of
standards on computer arithmetic. It is compatible with ISO/IEC/IEEE 60559:2011,
more known as IEEE 754-2008, and much of the
specifications are for IEEE 754 special values
(though such values are not required by LIA itself, unless the parameter iec559 is true).
It was developed by the working group ISO/IEC JTC1/SC22/WG11, which was disbanded in 2011.

LIA consists of three parts:
 Part 1: Integer and floating point arithmetic, second edition published 2012.
 Part 2: Elementary numerical functions, first edition published 2001.
 Part 3: Complex integer and floating point arithmetic and complex elementary numerical functions, first edition published 2006.

Parts

Part 1
Part 1 deals with the basic integer and floating point datatypes (for multiple radices, including 2 and 10),
but unlike IEEE 754-2008 not the representation of the values. Part 1 also
deals with basic arithmetic, including comparisons, on values of such
datatypes. The parameter iec559 is expected to be
true for most implementations of LIA-1.

Part 1 was revised, to the second edition, to become more in line with the specifications
in parts 2 and 3.

Part 2
Part 2 deals with some additional "basic" operations on integer and floating point
datatype values, but focuses primarily on specifying requirements on numerical
versions of elementary functions. Much of the specifications in LIA-2 are inspired
by the specifications in Ada for elementary functions.

Part 3
Part 3 generalizes parts 1 and 2 to deal with imaginary and complex
datatypes and arithmetic and elementary functions on such values.
Much of the specifications in LIA-3 are inspired by the specifications
for imaginary and complex datatypes and operations in
C, Ada and
Common Lisp.

Bindings
Each of the parts provide suggested bindings for a number of
programming languages. These are not part of the LIA standards,
just suggestions, and are not complete. Authors of a programming
language standard may wish to alter the suggestions before any
incorporation in the programming language standard.

The C99, C11 and C17 standards for C, and in 2013, the standards for C++ and Modula-2, have partial bindings to LIA-1.

See also 
 IEEE 754, Standard for Floating-Point Arithmetic
 ISO/IEC 11404, General purpose datatypes

References

External links
 ISO/IEC 10967-1:2012, complete text of Part 1: Integer and floating point arithmetic.
 ISO/IEC 10967-2:2001, complete text of Part 2: Elementary numerical functions.
 ISO/IEC 10967-3:2006, complete text of Part 3: Complex integer and floating point arithmetic and complex elementary numerical functions.

Computer arithmetic
10967